Yury Aleksandrovich Gazinsky (born 20 July 1989) is a Russian professional footballer who plays as a defensive midfielder for FC Ural Yekaterinburg.

Club career
In May 2013, Gazinsky signed for FC Krasnodar on a three-year contract. He left Krasnodar as his contract expired in May 2022.

On 17 August 2022, Gazinsky signed a two-year contract with FC Ural Yekaterinburg.

International career
He was called up to the Russia national football team in August 2015 for the UEFA Euro 2016 qualifiers against Sweden and against Liechtenstein. He made his debut for the team on 31 August 2016 in a friendly against Turkey.

On 11 May 2018, he was included in Russia's extended 2018 FIFA World Cup squad. On 3 June 2018, he was included in the finalized World Cup squad. On 14 June 2018, he scored the first goal of the 2018 FIFA World Cup in the 12th minute of the opening match against Saudi Arabia. Russia went on to win the match 5–0. He stayed on the bench in the Round of 16 defeat of Spain before appearing as a substitute in the quarterfinal shoot-out loss to Croatia.

On 11 May 2021, he was named as a back-up player for Russia's UEFA Euro 2020 squad.

Career statistics

Club

International

International goals
Scores and results list Russia's goal tally first.

References

External links

1989 births
People from Komsomolsk-on-Amur
Sportspeople from Khabarovsk Krai
Living people
Russian footballers
Russia international footballers
Association football midfielders
FC Smena Komsomolsk-na-Amure players
FC Luch Vladivostok players
FC Torpedo Moscow players
FC Krasnodar players
FC Ural Yekaterinburg players
Russian Premier League players
Russian First League players
Russian Second League players
2017 FIFA Confederations Cup players
2018 FIFA World Cup players